The Long Island Press is a free monthly news and lifestyle periodical serving Long Island.

Alternative Weekly
Its previous print incarnation was as a free, independent print and digital monthly news journal with extensive coverage of local and national news, arts and entertainment, sports and alternative political viewpoints. The newspaper was founded in 2003 by Jed Morey after then parent company, Morey Publishing, bought The Island Ear, which was a free bi-monthly entertainment-oriented newspaper. Morey Publishing renamed the paper, using the same name of a daily newspaper that was forced out of business in 1977, and launched it as a free alternative newsweekly. The staff of the Press included former Newsday columnist Ed Lowe, television columnist Todd Hyman, and technology columnist Lazlow Jones.

On March 24, 2011, New York City's Daily News and Long Island Press announced that the News would print the Press on its state-of-the-art, high-volume, full-color press equipment. In 2014 the Long Island Press ceased printing of its paper to focus solely on their website.

Current status
In April 2017, the publication was acquired by Schneps Communications. In July 2017, it was announced that the publication would return to print in September 2017 as a free news and lifestyle monthly.

Awards
The alternative weekly print version of the Long Island Press won more than 300 awards throughout its 10 years in existence, including accolades from the Association of Alternative Newsweeklies (AAN), Fair Media Council, Society of Professional Journalists (SPJ), Press Club of Long Island (PCLI), Investigative Reporters and Editors (IRE), Columbia University Graduate School of Journalism, CUNY Graduate School of Journalism, Journalism Center on Children & Families, Philip Merrill College of Journalism at the University of Maryland, and Mollie Parnis Livingston Foundation. The paper was awarded the New York Press Association's top prize, the prestigious Stuart C. Dorman Award for Editorial Excellence, in 2010 and 2012, making it the association's "Newspaper of the Year" two out of three years.

Long Island Daily Press

The Long Island Press was also the name of a daily newspaper that lasted for 156 years. It was originally known as the Long Island Farmer which was founded in 1821. The paper changed its name to The Long Island Daily Press in 1921, then shortened it to Long Island Press in 1967. The Sunday edition bore the name Long Island Sunday Press. Both editions used a broadsheet format. It became known as the only New York paper to report on local government scandals until an extended strike by the Printing Pressmen's union forced the paper to go out of business on March 25, 1977. Regular columnists included Walter Kaner.

The Archives (formerly the Long Island Division) at the Queens Library has microfilm of the Long Island Daily Press from 1921 to 1977, and of the Long Island Farmer from 1821 to 1920. The Queens Library Archives also has a collection of approximately 3,000 photographs from the Long Island Daily Press photo morgue. The Levittown Public Library in Nassau County has microfilm of the Long Island Daily Press from 1944 to 1977.

References

External links
Long Island Press
Long Island Press' annual Best of Long Island feature

Companies based in Nassau County, New York
Defunct daily newspapers
Long Island
Newspapers published in New York (state)
Publications established in 2003
2003 establishments in New York (state)
Syosset, New York
Newspapers published in New York City
History of New York City
New York City local newspapers, in print